Psittacanthus, also parrot-flower, is a plant genus in the family Loranthaceae. It is a type of mistletoe native from central Mexico southwards to Central America and parts of South America.

It differs from most other Loranthaceae genera by its large flowers and bulky haustorial connections to its host, and by its large fruits. Its flowers frequently "light up the host tree in brilliant hues of red or red and yellow".

Life cycle
From inoculation of a branch with the seed to production of new seed on the plant requires about five years.
Psittacanthus is dispersed by birds feeding on fruits and defecating on
branches. Once the mistletoe is established, it flowers yearly. A five-year study of 
Psittacanthus calyculatus on Pinus douglasiana found that only five months after the sticky seed has inoculated the host tree, are the first true leaves produced.
In the May of the fourth year after infection, the shoots start to produce flower bud full flowering and pollination occurring in November and December. (Hummingbirds and passerines are thought to be the pollinators.) Fruit maturation takes about a year and occurs from November to February of the fifth year. The long life cycle means that infestations may be relatively easily controlled when trees are to be harvested for forestry.

Accepted species

{{ordered list|start=24
|Psittacanthus dichrous (Mart. ex Schult. & Schult.f.) Mart.
|Psittacanthus dilatatus A.C.Sm.
|Psittacanthus divaricatus (Kunth) G.Don
|Psittacanthus eucalyptifolius (Kunth) G.Don
|
|Psittacanthus gracilipes Rizzini
|Psittacanthus grandifolius Mart.
|Psittacanthus hamulifer Kuijt
|Psittacanthus irwinii Rizzini
|Psittacanthus julianus Rizzini
|Psittacanthus karwinskyanus (Schult. & Schult.f.) Eichler
|Psittacanthus kerberi Engl.
|Psittacanthus krameri Kuijt
|Psittacanthus krausei J.F.Macbr.
|Psittacanthus lasianthus Sandwith
|Psittacanthus gigas
|Psittacanthus lasserianus Rizzini
|Psittacanthus linearis (Killip) J.F.Macbr.
|Psittacanthus macrantherus Eichler
|Psittacanthus martinicensis (C.Presl) Eichler
|Psittacanthus mayanus Standl. & Steyerm.
|Psittacanthus melinonii (Tiegh.) Engl.
|Psittacanthus mexicanus (C.Presl ex Schult. & Schult.f.) G.Don
|Psittacanthus microphyllus Kuijt
|Psittacanthus mirandensis Rizzini
}}

EtymologyPsittacanthos comes from the Greek psittakos (parrot), and the Greek anthos'' (flower), possibly chosen, according to Don, because of the bright colours.

References

External links
 
Distribution of Psittacanthus sonorae: http://swbiodiversity.org/seinet/taxa/index.php?taxon=Psittacanthus+sonorae

 
Loranthaceae genera
Taxonomy articles created by Polbot
Taxa named by Carl Friedrich Philipp von Martius